Ted Daisher (born February 2, 1955) is an American football coach who lastly was head coach of the Hamburg Sea Devils (ELF), of the newly formed ELF, but released on the 6th of June, 2021. Daisher had several stops in the professional ranks. He was the defensive line coach for the Hartford Colonials in the United Football League, and was the special teams coordinator for three different National Football League teams, the Philadelphia Eagles, Cleveland Browns, and Oakland Raiders.

References

1955 births
Living people
People from Taylor, Michigan
Western Michigan Broncos football players
Cincinnati Bearcats football coaches
Army Black Knights football coaches
Indiana Hoosiers football coaches
East Carolina Pirates football coaches
Philadelphia Eagles coaches
Oakland Raiders coaches
Cleveland Browns coaches
Hartford Colonials coaches
Walsh Cavaliers football coaches
European League of Football coaches